Garden Road may refer to:

 Garden Road stop, the lower terminus of the Peak Tram line, Hong Kong
 Garden Road, Hong Kong, on Hong Kong Island
 Hankow Road, formerly Garden Road, in Tsim Sha Tsui, Kowloon, Hong Kong
 "Garden Road", an unreleased song by Rush intended for inclusion on the 1974 album Rush